The 1945 Central Michigan Chippewas football team represented Central Michigan College of Education, later renamed Central Michigan University, as an independent during the 1945 college football season.  In their ninth season under head coach Ron Finch, the Chippewas compiled a 6–1 record, shut out five of seven opponents, allowed an average of fewer than four points per game, and outscored all opponents by a combined total of 98 to 26. The team's sole loss was to Bowling Green (6-19), allowing only seven points in the six wins.

Schedule

References

Central Michigan
Central Michigan Chippewas football seasons
Central Michigan Chippewas football